Black Tusk is an American sludge metal band from Savannah, Georgia, formed in 2005.

History 
The band was formed in 2005, when its members were all living on the same street. With the dissolution of Andrew Fidler's (guitars, vocals) and Jonathan Athon's (bass, vocals) crust punk band and James May's (drums, vocals) street punk band, Fidler and Athon went down the street to May's house and asked him if he wanted to play with them. During the next few days they jammed continuously, and within a few months they had recorded the EP When Kingdoms Fall, which was released via Wrecked Signal. 

Two years later the band self-released their first full-length studio album, The Fallen Kingdom, followed by another a year later with Passage Through Purgatory, released through the local label Hyperrealist Records. In 2009, Black Tusk released a series of split albums with bands such as ASG, The Holy Mountain, and Fight Amp, before sign to Relapse Records in November. The band released its debut for Relapse, Taste the Sin, in May 2010.

Black Tusk is mostly associated with Baroness and Kylesa, for their shared hometown of Savannah, as well as for their sludge metal sound. The band is linked to Baroness' guitarist and vocalist John Dyer Baizley, who is also a painter and creates all of Black Tusk's artwork.

On November 9, 2014, band member Jonathan Athon died due to injuries sustained from a motorcycle accident. He was placed in a medically induced coma and, per his wishes, was pulled from life support after it was determined that he had irreparable brain damage.

On December 10, 2014, the band confirmed they would be touring with Black Label Society in early 2015, with Corey Barhorst filling in on bass duties, as well as confirmed they finished the recording of their next album prior to the death of Athon.

Musical style
Black Tusk's members describe their music as "swamp metal", a term that has been described by AllMusic as "the murkiest, dirtiest sludge to come out of Savannah since Kylesa". The term is a reference to the climate of Savannah in relation to the music that the band create. Reviewing the album, Taste the Sin, Pitchfork Media stated that the band's blend of hardcore punk and stoner metal "works to capitalize on the immediacy of its chosen genres and not to bend them into obscurity." Black Tusk acknowledges its punk rock origins, but prefer not to cite a list of bands that influence them because they feel that it is ineffective since they are not "trying to emulate any one band's style or any one genre's sound."

Members

Current 
Andrew Fidler – guitars, vocals 
James May – drums, vocals 
Derek Lynch – bass, vocals 
Chris "Scary" Adams - guitars

Former 
Jonathan Athon – bass, vocals 

Corey Barhorst - bass, vocals

Discography 
Albums
The Fallen Kingdom (2007)
Passage Through Purgatory (2008)
Taste the Sin (2010)
Set the Dial (2011)
Pillars of Ash (2016)
T.C.B.T. (2018)

EPs
When Kingdoms Fall (2005)
Tend No Wounds (2013)
Vulture's Eye (2014)

Splits
Low Country, with ASG

Other appearances
Metal Swim – Adult Swim compilation album (2010)

Music videos

References

External links

Musical groups established in 2005
Heavy metal musical groups from Georgia (U.S. state)
American sludge metal musical groups
American stoner rock musical groups
Relapse Records artists
Musical groups from Savannah, Georgia
Musical quartets